Bouncing Betty is the allied nickname for an S-mine, a German bounding mine used in the 1930s and 1940s.

Bouncing Betty may also refer to:

 Bouncing Betty (comics), a fictional character in the X-Men story arc X-Men: Nation X
 Bouncing Betty Records, a punk-rock label whose catalog includes The Scarred
 Bouncing betty, in angling, a type of lead weight used by a flosser

See also 
 "The Bouncing Betty Caper", an episode of the radio series The Adventures of Sam Spade
 The Case of the Bouncing Betty, a 1957 novel by Michael Avallone in the Ace mystery double series
 Bouncing Bet or Common Soapwort, a vespertine flower